The Euclidean rhythm in music was discovered by Godfried Toussaint in 2004 and is described in a 2005 paper "The Euclidean Algorithm Generates Traditional Musical Rhythms". The greatest common divisor of two numbers is used rhythmically giving the number of beats and silences, generating almost all of the most important world music rhythms, except Indian. The beats in the resulting rhythms are as equidistant as possible; the same results can be obtained from the Bresenham algorithm.

Summary of algorithm 

In Toussaint's paper the task of distributing  beats within  time steps is considered. It is given that , so there are fewer beats than steps. The question arises of how to distribute these beats such that they are as equidistant as possible. This is easy when  is divisible by —in this case we distribute the beats such that they are  steps away from their neighbour. These beats are 4 steps away from each other because .

 [ x . . . x . . . x . . . x . . . ]

Here "x" represents a beat and "." represents a silence.

The problem becomes more complicated when  does not divide . In this case the formula  doesn't produce an integer, so some beats must be slightly closer to one neighbour than the other. Because of this the beats are no longer perfectly equidistant. A naive algorithm may place the beats like this:

 [ x . x . x . . x . . x . . ]

Although the beats are technically distributed with ideal spacing between the beats—they are either two steps apart or three—we still have a problem where the beats are "clumped" at the start and spaced out at the end. A more concrete definition of "equidistant" might ask that these spacings ("x ." and "x . .") are also distributed evenly. 

Toussaint's observation is that Euclid's algorithm can be used to systematically find a solution for any  and  that minimizes "clumping." Taking the previous example where  and  we perform Euclid's algorithm:

Toussaint's algorithm first constructs the following rhythm.

 [ x x x x x . . . . . . . . ]

Then, using the sequence  we iteratively take  columns off the right of the sequence and place them at the bottom.

 [ x x x x x . . .
   . . . . .       ]

 [ x x x x x
   . . . . .
   . . .     ]

 [ x x x
   . . .
   . . .
   x x
   . .   ]

The process stops here because , i.e. there is only one column to move. The final beat pattern is read out from top to bottom, left to right:

 [ x . . x . x . . x . x . . ]

Other uses of Euclid's algorithm in music 

In the 17th century Conrad Henfling writing to Leibniz about music theory and the tuning of musical instruments makes use of the Euclidean algorithm in his reasoning.

See also 
 Algorithmic composition
 Polyrhythm

References

External links 
 G. T. Toussaint, The Euclidean algorithm generates traditional musical rhythms, Proceedings of BRIDGES: Mathematical Connections in Art, Music, and Science, Banff, Alberta, Canada, July 31 to August 3, 2005, pp. 47–56.
 
 
 Links to videos about and a Flash app for experimenting with Euclidean rhythms
 Euclidean rhythm demo — interactive browser-based tool for experimenting with Euclidean rhythms
 A tutorial on The Euclidean Algorithm Generates Traditional Musical Rhythms by Derek Rivait
 SoundHelix is a free software for algorithmic random music composition that supports Euclidean rhythms
 Euclidian rhythms list - a list of all Euclidian rhythms E(i,2 to 32), indicating if they are Winograd-deep, Erdős-deep, Authentic Aksak, Quasi-Aksak or Pseudo-Aksak

Euclid
Music theory
Musical analysis